Benjamin Todd Jealous (born January 18, 1973) is an American civil rights leader and social impact investor. He served as the president and chief executive officer of the National Association for the Advancement of Colored People (NAACP) from 2008 to 2013. When he was selected to head the NAACP at age 35, he became the organization's youngest-ever national leader. The Washington Post in 2013 described him as "one of the nation's most prominent civil rights leaders."

Jealous ran for governor of Maryland in the 2018 election. He ran as a Democrat, and won the party's nomination in the June 2018 primary, defeating Prince George's County Executive Rushern Baker and seven other candidates. However, he lost in the general election to the incumbent governor, Republican Larry Hogan.

Jealous is a partner at Kapor Capital, board chairman of the Southern Elections Fund and one of the John L. Weinberg/Goldman Sachs Visiting Professors at Princeton University's Woodrow Wilson School. In 2013, Jealous was named a Young Global Leader by the Davos World Economic Forum.

Jealous was selected as president of People for the American Way, and its associated foundation, on June 2, 2020, and assumed the position on June 15. On November 14, 2022, Jealous was named the executive director of the Sierra Club, the first person of color to hold the position, effective Jan. 23, 2023. Jealous' 2023 book, Never Forget Our People Were Always Free: A Parable of American Healing was released on January 10, 2023.

Early life and education
Jealous was born in 1973 in Pacific Grove, California, and grew up on the Monterey Peninsula. His mother, Ann Jealous (née Todd), is biracial. She worked as a psychotherapist and had grown up in Baltimore. She had participated there in the desegregation of Western High School. She is the author, with Caroline Haskell, of Combined Destinies: Whites Sharing Grief about Racism (2013). His father, Fred Jealous, who is white, is descended from settlers of the Massachusetts Bay Colony, related to businessman Joseph B. Sargent, and directly in line to inherit the fortune from the Sargent and Co business. He founded the Breakthrough Men's Community and participated in Baltimore sit-ins to desegregate lunch counters. Jealous's parents met in Baltimore in 1966. At the time, they did not openly date each other in public; when they went to the movies, they took separate paths to adjacent seats to hide their relationship. As an interracial couple, they were prohibited by state law from marrying in Maryland before 1967. They married in Washington, D.C., and returned to live in Baltimore for a time before moving to California in the early-1970s. As a child, Jealous was sent to Baltimore to spend his summers with his maternal grandparents, who lived in the Ashburton neighborhood. Jealous graduated from York School in Monterey, California in 1990.

Jealous's father was best friends with comedian Dave Chappelle's father, William David Chappelle III; as a result, Jealous has been friends with Dave Chappelle since childhood, and the two are god-brothers.

Jealous earned a Bachelor of Arts degree in political science from Columbia University. A Rhodes Scholar, he later earned a Master of Science in comparative social research from St Antony's College, Oxford.

Career

Early activism
At Columbia University, Jealous began working as an organizer with the NAACP Legal Defense Fund. As a student, he protested the university's plan to turn the Audubon Ballroom (the site of Malcolm X's assassination) into a research facility and was suspended. During his suspension, Jealous traveled through the South. During this time Mississippi's three black colleges were slated to be closed because of financial difficulties. Jealous organized with the local NAACP chapter to keep them fully funded and maintain their operations.

While in Mississippi, Jealous began working as a reporter for Jackson Advocate, Mississippi's oldest historically black newspaper, under the tutelage of publisher Charles Tisdale. He eventually became its managing editor. His reporting was credited with exposing corruption among high-ranking officials at the state prison in Parchman. In addition, he helped acquit a small farmer who had been wrongfully accused of arson. Jealous returned to Columbia in 1997, where he applied for and was awarded a Rhodes Scholarship.

After completing his degree at Oxford and returning to the US, Jealous worked as executive director of the National Newspaper Publishers Association (NNPA), a federation of more than 200 black community newspapers. During his term, he relocated the organization's editorial office to Howard University in Washington, D.C. He set up an online syndicated news service that shared content with all of the organization's member papers.

After the NNPA, he served as director of the US Human Rights Program at Amnesty International. He focused on issues such as promoting federal legislation against prison rape, racial profiling, and the sentencing of persons to life without the possibility of parole (LWOP) who are convicted for acts committed as children. (In 2012, the US Supreme Court ruled that such sentencing was unconstitutional, and ordered its ruling to be applied to people already in prison.) Jealous is the lead author of the 2004 report "Threat and Humiliation: Racial Profiling, Domestic Security, and Human Rights in the United States."

Jealous was President of the Rosenberg Foundation, a private foundation located in San Francisco, California from 2005 to 2008.

NAACP

Jealous was elected in 2008 as president and CEO of the NAACP; at age 35, he was the youngest person to serve in that position. He served until late 2013. During his term, Jealous initiated national programs on criminal justice, health, environmental justice and voting rights, expanded existing programs and opened the NAACP Financial Freedom Center to provide financial education and banking resources.

During his tenure, the NAACP helped register 374,553 voters and mobilize 1.2 million new voters to turn out at the polls for the 2012 presidential election. It supported abolition of the death penalty in Connecticut and Maryland, endorsed same-sex marriage, and fought laws it believed were intended for voter suppression in states across the country.

During Jealous's tenure, the number of NAACP's online activists increased from 175,000 to more than 675,000; its donors increased from 16,000 individuals to more than 132,000; and the number of total NAACP activists was 1.7 million.

Jealous led the NAACP to work closely with other civil rights, labor and environmental groups. In 2010 the NAACP was one of the conveners of the One Nation Working Together Rally, which Jealous referred to as "an antidote" to the Tea Party. In June 2012, the NAACP led several thousand protesters from different groups to march down New York City's Fifth Avenue in protest of the NYPD's policy of stop-and-frisk policing. In 2012 Jealous formed the Democracy Initiative along with other progressive leaders, to build a national campaign around three goals: getting big money out of politics, supporting voting rights, and reforming broken Senate rules. Finally, in 2013 Jealous gave the keynote address at the A10 Rally for Citizenship, a major rally for immigration reform at the US Capitol.

Jealous broadened the NAACP's alliances in 2011 at the National Press Club when a conservative coalition of criminal justice reform advocates endorsed an NAACP report authored by Jealous. In the report, Jealous highlights the adverse effects of over-incarceration of youth on society and the case for increasing public funding for education. In Texas later that year, the NAACP worked with leaders of the Tea Party to pass a dozen criminal justice reform measures, leading to the first scheduled prison closure in state history. Similarly, in 2013, the NAACP worked closely with Virginia Governor Bob McDonnell to pass bipartisan voting rights reform that gave former offenders the chance to vote after they served the terms of their sentence.

Upon announcing his resignation in 2013, Jealous was praised by activists for his coalition-building efforts.

Jealous was noted for reviving and building the resources of the NAACP. According to The Chronicle of Philanthropy, he was:

2018 Maryland gubernatorial election campaign

On May 31, 2017, Jealous announced his candidacy for governor of Maryland in the 2018 election, then held by Larry Hogan (R). His running mate was Susan Turnbull.

Many labor and progressive groups issued early endorsements of Jealous, including the American Postal Workers Union (APWU-Maryland), Communications Workers of America (CWA), National Nurses United, the Maryland State Education Association, the Service Employees International Union (SEIU), UNITE-HERE, Democracy for America, Friends of the Earth Action, the Maryland Working Families Party, Our Revolution and Progressive Maryland.

Jealous received endorsements from Senators Bernie Sanders, Cory Booker, and Kamala Harris, as well as longtime friend, comedian Dave Chappelle.

The Democratic primary was held on June 26, 2018. Despite trailing in polling in the months prior to the primary, Jealous and Turnbull won the primary with 40% of the vote in a nine-candidate field, 10% ahead of the second place duo.

Jealous ran on a platform that included free college tuition, legalized marijuana, universal healthcare, and a $15 minimum wage for Marylanders. His views were described by an analyst for Circa News as democratic socialist. However, Jealous disputed this characterization. On August 8, 2018, when questioned by a reporter about whether he considered himself a socialist, Jealous referred to himself as a "venture capitalist." When the reporter asked a second time whether he was a socialist, he responded, "Are you fucking kidding me?"

In October 2018, Jealous confirmed to Washington Jewish Week that he would "vow to defend" the Executive Order by Hogan related to banning companies from working with the state who boycott the Israeli Occupation and/or settlements. This order is very similar to one the ACLU successfully challenged into suspension in Arizona as unconstitutional. Jealous's campaign added that if the ACLU was successful in suspending the Maryland order, he would "bring leaders in the Jewish community and the Maryland-Israel Development Center together ...to figure out if there's a constitutional way to discourage the BDS movement in Maryland."

The general election was held on November 6, 2018, and Jealous lost the election to the incumbent governor, Hogan by a wide margin of 11.9%.

Memberships
In 2014 Jealous became a senior partner at Kapor Capital, a firm that leverages the tech sector to create progressive social change. He also joined the Center for American Progress as a senior fellow.

Political endorsements
Jealous is a progressive Democrat. He endorsed Bernie Sanders in his 2016 campaign for U.S. president, then supported Hillary Clinton after she was nominated as a candidate by the Democratic Party.

Personal life

Jealous was married to Lia Epperson, an NAACP lawyer and law professor at American University Washington College of Law in July 2002. Epperson is the sister of CNBC correspondent Sharon Epperson. Jealous and Epperson have two children. The couple divorced in 2015. Jealous has been a vegetarian since 1978.

Awards and honors
Jealous has earned the following awards and honors for his activism:
 In March 2009, Jealous received the John Jay Award for distinguished professional achievement from Columbia College and in 2010 spoke as the Class Day speaker at Columbia University.
 In 2010, Jealous was named to Time magazine's "40 Under 40" rising stars of American politics.
 In 2010 and 2011, Jealous was named to the Nonprofit Times "Power & Influence Top 50" list.
 In 2012 Jealous was named to Fortune magazine's "40 Under 40" list.
 Jealous was ranked No. 3 on the 2012 Root Top 100 list.
 In December 2012, Jealous was awarded the 2012 Puffin/Nation Prize for Creative Citizenship, which is given annually to an individual who has challenged the status quo through distinctive, courageous, imaginative, and socially responsible work of significance.
 In March 2013, Jealous was named a Young Global Leader by the Davos World Economic Forum.
 Jealous was ranked No. 1 on The 2013 Root Top 100 list.
 In December 2013 Jealous was named Marylander of The Year by the Baltimore Sun.

See also
Reach: 40 Black Men Speak on Living, Leading and Succeeding, a book of personal essays edited by Jealous and Trabian Shorters

References

External links
 NAACP Biography
 TheLoop21.com (Archive) interview with NAACP President Ben Jealous
 Is The NAACP's Relevance Fading? We Think Not. (Archive) by Benjamin Jealous and Julian Bond for The New Republic.

1973 births
Living people
Activists from California
African-American people in Maryland politics
Alumni of University College, Oxford
American chief executives
American Rhodes Scholars
California Democrats
Columbia College (New York) alumni
NAACP activists
Maryland Democrats
People from Pacific Grove, California
Candidates in the 2018 United States elections
21st-century African-American politicians
21st-century American politicians
20th-century African-American people
People for the American Way people